Andrés Felipe Mosquera Guardia (born 20 February 1990) is a Colombian professional footballer who plays as a defender for Liga MX club Toluca.

Honours
León
Liga MX: Guardianes 2020
Leagues Cup: 2021

References

External links
 
 Andrés Mosquera deja Medellín y se va para León de México 

1990 births
Colombian footballers
Living people
Sportspeople from Antioquia Department
Independiente Medellín footballers
América de Cali footballers
Categoría Primera A players
Colombian expatriate footballers
Expatriate footballers in Mexico
Club León footballers
Liga MX players
Association football defenders